Maria-Elena Papasotiriou (born 27 January 1990) is an American former competitive figure skater who represented Greece. She was born in Park Ridge, Illinois. She was placed 31st at the 2007 European Championships.

Competitive highlights

References

External links

 
 Tracings.net profile

Greek female single skaters
1990 births
Living people
Sportspeople from Park Ridge, Illinois
American female single skaters
21st-century American women